Jo-Anne Marie Luxton (born 1973) is a New Zealand politician and a Member of Parliament in the House of Representatives for the Labour Party.

Personal life
Luxton owns and operates the Hinds Early Learning Centre, the first such business in New Zealand to be an accredited Living Wage Employer. She is the great-niece of former Labour Prime Minister Norman Kirk. She is of Māori descent.

In October 2022 she admitted causing a three-car crash in Timaru.

Political career

Luxton did not win the electorate, but entered parliament as a list MP.

At the 2020 New Zealand general election Luxton again ran in Rangitata for the Labour party; and in a surprise victory, defeated National's Megan Hands by a final margin of 4,408 votes. Rangitata had been traditionally regarded as a safe National seat.

In a cabinet reshuffle by Prime Minister Chris Hipkins on 31 January 2023, Luxton was appointed a Parliamentary Under-secretary for Agriculture and Education.

Views and politics

Cannabis
In mid–September 2020, Luxton announced that she would not be voting in support of the Cannabis Legalisation and Control Bill referendum, citing her own personal experiences of being in relationship with a person who abused cannabis.

Euthanasia
Luxton has stated that she would be voting in favour of the End of Life Choice Act 2019 during the 2020 euthanasia referendum, citing her belief that people should be able to die with dignity and the experiences of her terminally ill mother.

References

External links
 

1973 births
Living people
New Zealand Labour Party MPs
Members of the New Zealand House of Representatives
21st-century New Zealand women politicians
New Zealand list MPs
Women members of the New Zealand House of Representatives
Candidates in the 2017 New Zealand general election
Candidates in the 2020 New Zealand general election